Kevin M. M. Ranker (born 1970) is an American politician who is a member of the Democratic Party. He represented the 40th District from 2009 to 2019 in the Washington State Senate.

Prior to his election to the Senate, Ranker served as a member of the San Juan County Council. In 2011, he was appointed as an Advisor to President Obama's National Ocean Council. He is also the 2013-2014 President of Pacific Northwest Economic Region, a partnership of ten U.S. states and Canadian provinces.

Ranker was first elected in 2008, winning 58.6% of the vote against Republican Steve Van Luven. He was re-elected in 2012 with 62.9% of the vote, defeating Republican John Swapp.

Ranker resigned from the Senate on 9 January 2019, following sexual harassment and hostile workplace accusations.

Ranker lives on Orcas Island with his wife and daughter; his son serves in the U.S. Navy.

References

External links
Official page at the Washington State Legislature
Campaign site

Kevin Ranker at Ballotpedia
Kevin M. Ranker at the National Institute on Money in State Politics

1970 births
Living people
People from San Juan County, Washington
San Juan County Councillors
21st-century American politicians
Democratic Party Washington (state) state senators